The NDR Klein Computer, abbreviated NKC, was a do-it-yourself computer project from the early 1980s developed by  (RDK) and Joachim Arendt. In 1984, the computer was featured in the educational television series NDR-Klein-Computer for NDR-Schulfernsehen (NDR School Television). It was also broadcast on the computer television show  on the Bavarian TV network Bayerisches Fernsehen (BFS).

History
The NDR Klein Computer was created by Rolf-Dieter Klein, a computer enthusiast who regularly contributed articles to the German computer magazine mc. His plan was not only to give a basic introduction to the way a computer operates, but also to introduce a modular system through which laymen could learn to complete basic programming exercises, as well as acquire the skills to operate a high-end home computer. Under the direction of Joachim Arendt, they developed a television series that was picked up by Norddeutscher Rundfunk (NDR) for its NDR-Schulfernsehen (NDR School Television) channel. The series, titled NDR-Klein-Computer, consisted of twenty-six episodes of fifteen minutes each. Klein hosted the show and wrote articles in mc to supplement the series. He published a book on the same subject, titled: Microcomputer Selbstgebaut und Programmiert (DIY Microcomputer Building and Programming), through Franzis Verlag, which also released the TV series on VHS. The computer's hardware was provided by Graf Elektronik System in Kempten, and sold at an electronics store in Detmold. The company Fischertechnik also produced a robot kit, which was one of the most comprehensive 32-bit programming language applications at the time.

Features
The NKC was built with several different hardware configurations, from a simple 8-bit single-board computer based on a Zilog Z80A processor to a 32-bit system equipped with a Motorola 68020 CPU. The software could be loaded with EPROMs or involve an operating system such as CP/M which could handle executable programs in various programming languages.

A helper card with an Intel 8088 processor allowed the NKC to run MS-DOS. Systems could be customized to handle many different peripherals including PS/2 keyboard, 3½-inch floppy disks, IDE-hard drives and modern storage. Users have developed new cards which replaced the former specialized components. For instance, a system could contain a new graphics card (with VGA connector), one serial port, a sound card,  and a mouse connector. Another system configuration that supports booting via the IDE-interface has been developed for the 68xxx family.

Gallery

Books

See also 
 BBC computer
 WDR computer
 Thomson EF9366

References

External links 
 thtec.org - NKC-Seite mit neuen Schaltplänen und Ideen (NKC-site with new schematics and ideas) 
 computermuseum-mannheim.de/comp_nkc.htm - Fotos und Infos zum NDR Klein Computer (Photos and information on the NDR small computer) 
 retrobu.de - Geschichte zur Serie und zum NKC (History of the series and the NKC) 
 NDR-NKC site by Andreas Rohmann 

Microcomputers